The Lurgan Hemmers' Veiners' and General Workers' Union, also known as the Lurgan Hemmers' and Veiners' Trade Union and the Lurgan Hemmers' and Veiners' and General Women Workers' Trade Union, was a trade union in Northern Ireland. It was formed in 1885 but 'faded away' some time before 1889. It was re-established in 1901–2. In 1911 the union had 2,500 members. It primarily represented female workers and was briefly affiliated to the Irish Trades Union Congress in 1911. It merged with the Transport and General Workers' Union in 1951.

General Secretaries
1900s: Minnie Rodgers
c.1919: Robert Levin

See also
 Transport and General Workers' Union
 TGWU amalgamations

References

Defunct trade unions of Ireland
Trade unions in Northern Ireland
Transport and General Workers' Union amalgamations
Trade unions established in 1885
Trade unions disestablished in 1951